Cédric Séguin (born 3 April 1973) is a French fencer. He won a silver medal in the team sabre event at the 2000 Summer Olympics.

References

External links
 

1973 births
Living people
French male sabre fencers
Olympic fencers of France
Fencers at the 2000 Summer Olympics
Olympic silver medalists for France
Olympic medalists in fencing
Sportspeople from Drôme
Medalists at the 2000 Summer Olympics